Illey Pastures is a  biological site of Special Scientific Interest in the West Midlands. The site was notified in 1989 under the Wildlife and Countryside Act 1981. It is close to the village of Illey.

See also
List of Sites of Special Scientific Interest in the West Midlands

References
 Illey Pastures citation sheet Natural England. Retrieved on 2008-05-28

Sites of Special Scientific Interest notified in 1989
Sites of Special Scientific Interest in the West Midlands (county)